Album of the Year is considered to be one of the top five accolades of the South African Music Awards (SAMAs), an annual award ceremony coordinated by the Recording Industry of South Africa (RiSA). The recording artist(s) who released the winning album are given a statuette called a SAMA. To be eligible for nomination, an album must have been released by a South African artist in the calendar year before the year of the ceremony. The ceremony is held in April or May, and features live performances by some of the nominees. The event is broadcast on SABC1.

The South African Music Awards were established in 1995, but the "Album of the Year" category was not added until 2007.

The following is a list of artists and albums that won a SAMA in the "Album of the Year" category.

2000s

2010s

References

South African Music Awards
Album awards